Vihansa is the name of a Germanic goddess written on a bronze tablet found in Sint-Huibrechts-Hern, near Tongeren in modern Belgium.

Name 
There is general agreement among scholars that the theonym is Germanic; it probably belongs to the Tungrian dialect or language. Vihansa is most likely a Latinized form of the compound *wiha-ansu-, meaning 'holy deity'.

Dedication 
The inscription was engraved by Q. Catius Libo Nepos, centurion with Legio III Cyrenaica, who dedicated his shield and spear to the goddess Vihansa, probably after returning to his homeland from a military service:

Marie-Thérèse Raepsaet-Charlier supposes she must have been a warrior deity due to the martial offering mentioned in the inscription.

References

Bibliography

External links 

 Photo of the dedication.

Germanic goddesses
Latin inscriptions
Germanic deities